Attar, or qattar (Arabic: قَطْر) is a type of sweet syrup used in the preparation of Middle Eastern desserts. It is made of primarily sugar and water, and is reduced slightly until somewhat golden and thicker. It is sometimes accented by steeping additional flavorings such as lemon juice, rose water or oil, or attar (a rose-hinted plant of similar name). It is an essential addition to many Arabic or Levantine desserts, including but not limited to knafeh, baklava, and harisseh, and is added cold or at room temperature to a hot dessert after it is baked.

References

See also
 List of syrups

Arab cuisine

Middle Eastern cuisine
Syrup